Midnight Masquerade is a 2014 American/Canadian romantic comedy. It was directed by Graeme Campbell and starred Autumn Reeser and Christopher Russell, premiering on Hallmark Channel on October 26, 2014.

Plot 
In this modern-day reverse Cinderella story, a young and naive lawyer, exploited by his boss, gets his life turned around after meeting the beautiful Elyse Samford, CEO of a candy company. Their first date takes place at the annual Halloween masquerade ball.

Cast
Autumn Reeser as Elyse Samford 
Christopher Russell as Rob Carelli
Richard Burgi as Howard Samford
Helen Colliander as Ruby
Damon Runyan as Emmett Higgins
Neil Crone as Sam
Danny Smith as Andrew Higgins

References

External links

2014 television films
2014 films
Canadian comedy television films
English-language Canadian films
Films shot in Ontario
Hallmark Channel original films
2014 romantic comedy films
Films with screenplays by Patricia Resnick
Films directed by Graeme Campbell (director)
Canadian romantic comedy films
2010s Canadian films